Packwood House-American Hotel, also known as the Packwood House Museum, is a historic inn and tavern located at Lewisburg, Union County, Pennsylvania, USA. It was originally built about 1813, and expanded about 1866.  It is a three-story, log and frame building with a gable roof. It has a two-story, pent roof rear addition. It has housed a decorative arts museum since 1972.

It was listed on the National Register of Historic Places in 1978. It is located in the Lewisburg Historic District.

References

External links
Packwood House Museum website

Art museums and galleries in Pennsylvania
Hotel buildings on the National Register of Historic Places in Pennsylvania
Commercial buildings completed in 1813
Hotel buildings completed in 1866
Buildings and structures in Union County, Pennsylvania
Museums in Union County, Pennsylvania
Decorative arts museums in the United States
Historic district contributing properties in Pennsylvania
1866 establishments in Pennsylvania
National Register of Historic Places in Union County, Pennsylvania